A lanai or lānai is a type of roofed, open-sided veranda, patio, or porch originating in Hawaii. Many homes, apartment buildings, hotels and restaurants in Hawaii are built with one or more lānais.

In Hawaii, the term's use has grown colloquially to encompass any sort of outdoor living area connected to or adjacent to an interior space—whether roofed or not—including apartment and hotel balconies.

Examples
One example of Hawaiian architecture featuring a lānai is the Albert Spencer Wilcox Beach House on the Island of Kauai. The residence of Queen Liliuokalani, Washington Place in Honolulu, was constructed with "open lānais" on all sides.

Architectural feature
The use of the lānai is one of the "Hawaiian modern" features in the style of some of the buildings of Vladimir Ossipoff, who saw in the lanai functional similarities to the Japanese engawa. A lanai may also be a covered exterior passageway. Disney animator Dorse Lanpher (1935–2011) notes in his memoirs the large covered lanais on the ocean side of his Honolulu hospital. Today, air-conditioned buildings such as hotels often offer "enclosed" rather than "open" lanais, sometimes meaning a large dining hall with a 'wall' of sliding glass doors.

In popular culture
On The Golden Girls, the outdoor space of the titular characters' house is referred to as a lanai, particularly by Blanche Deveraux, even though it is more properly a patio.

Gallery

References

Architecture in Hawaii
Hawaii culture
Hawaiian words and phrases
Rooms